Claire Janowski is an American politician and the current Democratic candidate for mayor in Vernon, Connecticut.

Janowski began her political career at the local level in Vernon. She was active in the parent-teacher organization as well as the Little League Auxiliary before serving seven years each on the planning and zoning commission and the town council. Janowski contested her first legislative election in 2000, and was seated to the Connecticut House of Representatives in January 2001. She did not stand in the 2016 elections, and stepped down after sixteen years in office.

References

Living people
Women state legislators in Connecticut
Democratic Party members of the Connecticut House of Representatives
Connecticut city council members
Women city councillors in Connecticut
Year of birth missing (living people)
21st-century American women